Charles Hough may refer to:

 Charles Merrill Hough (1858–1927), American lawyer and federal judge in New York City
 Charles Hough Jr. (born 1934), American equestrian
 Charlie Hough (Charles Oliver Hough, born 1948), American professional baseball player